Île d'Orléans (French for "Isle of Orleans") was the historic name for the New Orleans area, in present-day Louisiana, U.S.A.

In 1762, France, anticipating that Great Britain would take Louisiana at the end of the French and Indian War, in the Treaty of Fontainebleau transferred to Spain all of Louisiana west of the Mississippi River, as well as a newly-defined area east of the Mississippi which included New Orleans, called the Isle of Orleans.

As the French had expected, in the Treaty of Paris (1763) the British took all of Louisiana east of the Mississippi, except for the Isle of Orleans, and incorporated it into their colony of West Florida, with the capital at Pensacola. Spanish possession of Louisiana west of the Mississippi River, and of the Isle of Orleans, was also confirmed in the Treaty of Paris. 

The Isle of Orleans was bounded by the Mississippi River, the Gulf of Mexico, Lakes Pontchartrain and Maurepas as well as Bayou Manchac, previously known as Iberville River, and the Amite River.

The Isle of Orleans was included in the 1803 Louisiana Purchase. It formed the southern border of the short-lived Republic of West Florida, a few years later.

References
 Leroy E. Willie, The West Florida Revolution Controversy: 1810, self-published, 2007 (available from the Louisiana chapter of the Sons of the American Revolution)
 
 Stanley Clisby Arthur, The Story of the West Florida Revolution, Claitor's Publishing
 Samuel C. Hyde, Consolidating the Revolution: Factionalism and Finesse in the West Florida Revolt, 1810 Louisiana History, Summer 2010

French-American culture in Louisiana
Pre-statehood history of Louisiana
History of New Orleans